Milan Milanović (born 21 January 1995) is a Serbian football defender who plays for FK Sloboda Užice.

Club career

Career statistics

External links
 

1995 births
Living people
People from Bajina Bašta
Association football defenders
Serbian footballers
Red Star Belgrade footballers
FK Sloboda Užice players
FK Javor Ivanjica players
FK Zlatibor Čajetina players
FK Novi Pazar players
FK Spartak Subotica players
Serbian First League players
Serbian SuperLiga players